Chandler (or Chandler Siding), in the far north-west corner of the state of South Australia, is a rail siding on the Adelaide-Darwin rail corridor.

It was named in 1872 by the state government after an operator on the Overland Telegraph Line who lived nearby.

It was one of nine sidings to which names were assigned in 1978 in connection with the Tarcoola to Alice Springs railway, which was completed in 1980. Although the experiential tourism train, The Ghan, passes once a week on its journey between Adelaide and Darwin, the train is not accessible at Chandler.

References

Railway stations in South Australia
Far North (South Australia)
Anangu Pitjantjatjara Yankunytjatjara